Oberjoch is a small village in the municipality of Bad Hindelang in the German district of Oberallgäu, Bavaria. It has a total population of 200 people.
The village is advertised as being the highest located ski resort in Germany, but several settlements are located higher (Feldberg, Winklmoos-Alm, Gerstruben).
It is popular for skiing in winter, and in summer, many hikers and mountaineers visit Oberjoch.

References 

Villages in Bavaria
Oberallgäu
Ski areas and resorts in Germany